Zolotovo is a rural locality (a village) in Fominskoye Rural Settlement, Gorokhovetsky District, Vladimir Oblast, Russia. The population was 46 as of 2010. There are 4 streets.

Geography 
Zolotovo is located on the Indrus River, 47 km southwest of Gorokhovets (the district's administrative centre) by road. Myasnikovo is the nearest rural locality.

References 

Rural localities in Gorokhovetsky District